The Silver Spring–Fairland Line designated Route Z6 or Z8 are daily bus routes operated by the Washington Metropolitan Area Transit Authority between Burtonsville Crossing Park & Ride lot (Z6) and Greencastle Park & Ride Lot (Z8), and Silver Spring station of the Red Line of the Washington Metro. The line operates every 20–30 minutes at all times. Both trips are roughly 60 minutes long.

Background
Route Z6 operates daily running between Silver Spring station and Burtonsville Crossing Park & Ride. The route operates via Calverton, Westfarm, and White Oak, Maryland. Weekend trips ends at #14000 Castle Boulevard.

Route Z8 operates daily running between Silver Spring station and Greencastle Park & Ride mostly along Castle Boulevard, Old Columbia Pike, and Colesville Road. Weekend trips ends at Briggs Chaney Park & Ride Lot.

Both Routes operate out of Montgomery division.

History
Route Z6 was created on January 27, 1985 which operated between Silver Spring station and Calverton mostly operating along Calverton Boulevard, Old Columbia Pike, Columbia Pike, Lockwood Drive, Colesville Road. In the 1990s, route Z6 was discontinued and replaced by route Z7 which took over the Calverton routing which Z6 operated on.

Route Z8 had prior incarnations as the Old Bladensburg Road Line and the Sligo Avenue Line. The lines were at first operated as streetcars under the Capital Traction Company. The lines would later be operated by buses in 1927 and 1940. Both lines were later merged into one, later operated until DC Transit in 1956 and then acquired by WMATA on February 4, 1973. However the Z8 was later replaced by Ride On.

Route Z8 would later be reincarnated as the Colesville Road–Fairland Line which would operate between Silver Spring station and Burtonsville Crossing Park & Ride lot via White Oak, Greencastle Park & Ride Lot, Briggs Chaney Park & Ride Lot, and a few peak-hour trips to Verizon–Chesapeake Complex.

After a series of proposals in early 2004, route Z6 was reincarnated in service as the Tanglewood–Westfarm Line to operate between Silver Spring station and Burtonsville Crossing Park & Ride lot via Calverton, Westfarm, and White Oak, Maryland on September 26, 2004. The new Z6 replaced the Glenmont–Silver Spring Line (Z1 and Z4), Colesville–Fairland Express Line (Z3 and Z5), the Calverton Express Line (Z7 and Z17), and route Z8's routing between Greencastle Park & Ride Lot and Burtonsville Park & Ride. Route Z6 replaced route Z4 routing between Lockwood Drive, Stewart Lane, and Old Columbia Pike through the White Oak Shopping Center and White Oak Apartments, Z1, Z4, Z5, Z7, & Z17's routing on Columbia Pike, Industrial Parkway, Tech Road, and Broadbirch Drive in Westfarm, and a portion of Z7 & Z17's routing on Calverton Boulevard in Calverton. Routes Z1, Z3, Z4, Z5, Z7, and Z17 were all discontinued and route Z8 was shorten to Greencastle Park & Ride Lot with all the discontinued routings combined into the new route Z6.

Route Z6 will operate along Lockwood Drive to White Oak, then operate to Calverton via Broadbirch Drive, Calverton Boulevard, Galway Drive, and Fairland Road. Route Z6 will then operate along Briggs Chaney Road serving Briggs Chaney Park & Ride and #14000 Castle Boulevard. It will then operate along Old Columbia Pike to Burtonsville Crossing Park & Ride lot. The service would only operate on weekdays however.

Also on the same day, route Z8 was shorten to operate between Silver Spring station and Greencastle Park & Ride Lot via Briggs Chaney Park & Ride Lot. Service to the Burtonsville Crossing Park & Ride Lot was replaced by new Route Z6. The Z8 also replaced portions of the Z1, Z3, Z4, and Z5 which were all discontinued on the same day.

On June 24, 2007, Z6 service to Tanglewood was discontinued and replaced by a new Ride On Route 21. The line was also changed from the Tanglewood–Westfarm Line to the Calverton–Westfarm Line.

When the Paul S. Sarbanes Transit Center at Silver Spring station opened, both routes were rerouted from its bus stop along Dixon Avenue to Bus Bay 106 and Bus Bay 114.

During WMATA's Fiscal Year of 2016, WMATA proposed for to add Saturday service to route Z6 between Silver Spring, Calverton and Fairland
with buses arriving every 30 minutes and to reduce the number of trips between Castle Boulevard and Burtonsville. WMATA reasons that the current route Z6 schedule does not provide enough time for buses to get from one end to the other, ridership is high for route Z6 on the weekdays, and there are very few riders using the Z6 between Castle Boulevard and Burtonsville.

On March 27, 2016, Saturday service was added for Route Z6 which will operate between Silver Spring station and #14000 Castle Boulevard only. Saturday service will operate every 30 minutes, the same as weekday frequency.

During WMATA's 2021 Fiscal Year, WMATA proposed to eliminate the Z6 route segment from Castle Boulevard to Burtonsville Park-and-Ride and replace it with the Ride On Flash BRT U.S. Route 29 route when it opens. However, Route Z6 will be extended to Greencastle Park and Ride replacing routes Z8 and Z11 and adding additional frequency to the Z6. The reasons all come down due to the upcoming Ride On Flash BRT service along U.S. Route 29. All Route Z8 service would be eliminated if the proposed changes goes through.

Montgomery County expressed concerns over the proposed Z6 and Z8 changes. According to Council Vice President Tom Hucker, residents impact 65,000 residents of the Maryland county.

At least 30 Montgomery County leaders called on WMATA not to cut Metrobus routes in the region, saying it will "disproportionately affect" students, seniors, and service workers with no other source of transportation. The letter's signatories include state senators Craig Zucker, Susan Lee, and Cheryl Kagan, Maryland State Delegates Marc Korman, Sara Love, and Julie Palakovich Carr and all nine members of the county council. In a letter to Metro Chairman Paul Smedberg, members of the Montgomery County Council and state delegation said they opposed the cuts, which are part of WMATA's proposed FY 2021 operating budget, and urged the agency to prioritize "maintaining frequent and reliable service." They also quote;

The Metrobus routes currently recommended for service reductions, including the Q, J, L and Z bus lines, provide transportation for many of our most transit-dependent residents," the lawmakers wrote. "Service reductions will disproportionately affect students commuting to Montgomery College, seniors running daily errands and service workers accessing jobs. Roughly 65,000 Montgomery riders use Metrobus on a daily basis, and for many these bus routes are their only source of transportation.

The 35 lawmakers ended the letter by saying cuts to Metrobus service for Montgomery County would counter their "regional goals of reducing traffic congestion and greenhouse gas emissions."

On April 2, 2020, the FY2021 budget was released and WMATA. In about 251 votes from customer feedback, 59% of votes were against the changes for Z6 with 18% of votes in favor with the remaining 33% uncertain. For route Z8, out of 286 votes from customer feedback, 70% of voters were against the changes while 13% were in favor of the changes with 17% uncertain.

Beginning on March 16, 2020, Routes Z6 and Z8 began operating on its Saturday schedule in WMATA's response to the COVID-19 pandemic. However on March 18, 2020, all Route Z6 service was suspended and Route Z8 was further reduced as WMATA shifted to a modified Sunday schedule.  On March 21, 2020, weekend service was reduced to operate every 30 minutes. Route Z6 service was restored on August 23, 2020, but operating every 60 minutes and weekend service being suspended. Route Z8 was also restored to its pre-pandemic schedule.

On September 26, 2020, WMATA proposed to eliminate all route Z6 Saturday service due to low federal funding. However, route Z6 Saturday service was restored and the route was restored to its pre-pandemic schedule on March 14, 2021. 

On September 5, 2021, Route Z6 and Z8 were merged into the Silver Spring–Fairland Line eliminating the Calverton–Westfarm Line and Fairland Line names operating every 15 minutes between both lines. Route Z6 also added new Sunday service. Route Z8's routing inside the Verizon-Chesapeake Complex was also eliminated. However, Route Z8 was extended to Greencastle Park & Ride during the weekday peak hours.

Incidents
 On February 1, 2012, a Z8 bus (DE40LF 6020) and a truck collided along Colesville Road and Franklin Avenue during the AM peak hour. Two passengers from the bus suffered minor injuries.
 On December 19, 2021, a car collided with a Z8 bus along Fairland Road and Fairridge Drive killing the driver and injuring the bus operator.

References

Z6
Transportation in Montgomery County, Maryland